Surfing in Siberia is a 1997 album by the Red Elvises.

Track listing 
Surfing in Siberia
Here I Am in Hollywood
Siberia
Hungarian Dance #5
Don't Stop the Dance
Give Me One More Chance
Love Pipe
Jerry's Got the Squeeze Box
I Wanna Rock'n'Roll All Night
My Darling Lorraine
Three Alley Cats
Rock'n'Roll Music
Ukrainian Dance #13

Credits 

Igor Yuzov - Guitar, Vocals
Zhenya Kolykhanov - Guitar, Vocals
Oleg Bernov - Guitar (Bass), Vocals
Avi Sills - Drums, Vocals
Barry Conley - Mixing
Gazelle Gaignaire - Photography
Jeff King - Engineer, Mastering, Mixing, Producer
Mike Melnick - Engineer

References

External links 
 Official site

Red Elvises albums
1997 albums